Enscepastra recurvata is a moth of the family Coleophoridae. It was described by Wolfram Mey in 2011. It is found in South Africa.

References

Coleophoridae
Moths described in 2011